Yevgeni Popov may refer to:

 Yevgeni Anatolyevich Popov (born 1946), Russian writer
 Yevgeny Popov (journalist) (born 1978), Russian journalist and politician
 Yevgeni Gennadyevich Popov (born 1988), Russian footballer
 Yevgeni Popov (cyclist) (born 1984), Russian cyclist
 Yevgeni Sergeyevich Popov (born 1977), Russian bobsledder